Tusu Festival is a folk festival held on the last day of the Bengali month of Poush, i.e., Makar Sankranti. It is mainly river centric.It is a unifying form of common faith and belief of the agrarian society in joy of harvesting crops. At the end of the festivities, the immersion of the image of Tusu is done vividly and with songs which have a melancholic ring. Rural fairs are also organised during the festival. The festival Tusu, is mostly celebrated in Southwest of West Bengal, Southeast of Jharkhand, Northeastern Odisha as well in the Tea-State of Assam.

Etymology
There are different theories about the origin of the word Tusu. Many believe that the word 'tusu' originates from rice bran, which is called Tush in Bengali.

See also
Bhadu

References

External links

Festivals of Bangladeshi culture
Culture of West Bengal